Fountain Glacier is a glacier between Nylen Glacier and Catspaw Glacier in the Asgard Range, McMurdo Dry Valleys, Antarctica. It flows south into Pearse Valley. It was named by the Advisory Committee on Antarctic Names (2004) after Andrew G. Fountain of the Department of Geology, Portland State University, a United States Antarctic Program investigator in glacier mass balance studies of the McMurdo Dry Valleys, 1993–2003.

References 

Glaciers of the Asgard Range
Glaciers of McMurdo Dry Valleys